Bembidion obscurellum is a species of ground beetle in the family Carabidae. It is found in Europe and Northern Asia (excluding China) and North America.

Subspecies
These seven subspecies belong to the species Bembidion obscurellum:
 Bembidion obscurellum corporaali Netolitzky, 1935
 Bembidion obscurellum fumipenne Fassati, 1957
 Bembidion obscurellum insperatum Lutshnik, 1938
 Bembidion obscurellum obscurellum (Motschulsky, 1845)
 Bembidion obscurellum thibeticum Fassati, 1957
 Bembidion obscurellum turanicum Csiki, 1928
 Ocydromus obscurellus obscurellus (Motschulsky, 1844)

References

Further reading

 

obscurellum
Articles created by Qbugbot
Beetles described in 1845
Beetles of Europe
Beetles of Asia
Beetles of North America